Hate Me is the fifth studio album by American rock band Escape the Fate. The album was produced by Howard Benson. The album features a new lineup; with Kevin "Thrasher" Gruft on lead guitar, bass, programming and TJ Bell on rhythm guitar and bass. It is the first album without Michael and Monte Money. The album was released on October 30, 2015 through Eleven Seven Music.

Background
After the return of bassist Max Green in 2013 and his second departure in 2014 the band went through a string of touring bassist and left the band in a state of uncertainty. Kevin "Thrasher" Gruft and TJ Bell ended up playing bass on the album. The band also lost guitarists Monte and Michael Money in late 2013. The band entered the studio on May 10, 2015 to start recording the album with Howard Benson.

Singles and promotion
In early August 2015 the band changed all of their social media photos to read "8.18.15" which was speculated to be a single release or an album announcement.

On August 18, the band released the single "Just a Memory" for free online and officially announced the album along with a worldwide tour.

Track listing

Personnel

Escape the Fate
 Craig Mabbitt – lead vocals
 Kevin Gruft – lead guitar, programming, engineer, bass, backing vocals
 TJ Bell – rhythm guitar, backing vocals, bass
 Robert Ortiz – drums, backing vocals

Artwork and design
 Spiral Grey – illustrations
 Trevor Niemann – design

Production
 Howard Benson – producer, mixing, keyboards
 Mike Plotnikoff – producer, mixing, engineer
 Lenny Skolnik – producer, keyboards, programming
 Don Bakeman – assistant engineer
 Chris Bousquet – assistant engineer
 Wendell Teague – assistant engineer
 Hatsukazu "Hatch" Inagaki – engineer
 Marc VanGool – guitar technician
 Jonny Litten – drum programming, keyboards, programming
 Paul DeCarli – digital editing

Charts

References

2015 albums
Escape the Fate albums
Eleven Seven Label Group albums
Albums produced by Howard Benson